Havránek (feminine Havránková) is a Czech surname meaning literally "little raven". Notable people include:

 Bedřich Havránek, Czech painter
 Bohuslav Havránek, Czech linguist
 František Havránek, Czech football manager
 Ivan Havránek, Czech figure skater
 Tomáš Havránek, Czech ice hockey player

Czech-language surnames